Book of Love is a 1990 American romantic comedy film directed by New Line Cinema founder Robert Shaye. It is based on the autobiographical novel Jack in the Box by William Kotzwinkle (the novel's name was changed to Book of Love during this film's original release).

The film was originally PG-13, but subsequent DVD releases have been the R-rated Director's Cut (R for sexual content and language). It stars Chris Young, Keith Coogan, and John Cameron Mitchell.

Plot

Jack Twiller (Michael McKean) gets greetings from a long-gone high-school girlfriend. This makes him open his school's yearbook - his "Book of Love". He remembers the old times, way back in the 1950s, when he was in his last year of high school (Chris Young) and his family just moved to the town. He hung out with geeky Paul Kane and tried to get the attention of Lily (Josie Bissett), who unfortunately was together with bully Angelo (Beau Dremann). He also finds himself attracted to Angelo's feisty sister Gina (Tricia Leigh Fisher).

Cast
 Michael McKean as Adult Jack Twiller
 Chris Young as Jack Twiller
 Tricia Leigh Fisher as Gina
 Keith Coogan as Crutch Kane
 John Cameron Mitchell as Floyd
 Josie Bissett as Lily
 Danny Nucci as Spider Bomboni
 Lin Shaye as Mrs. Flynn
 Beau Dremann as Angelo
 Ken Wahl as Angelo friend
 Brent David Fraser as Meatball
 Jill Jaress as Mrs. Kitty Twiller
 John Achom as Mr. Joe Twiller
 Brian Evans as Schank

Created brother
In the book Jack in the Box, Jack Twiller's experiences are followed from elementary school to high school, while in his screenplay, William Kotzwinkle creates a younger brother, dividing these experiences between two separate characters.

Filming locations
 Glendale, California
 Los Angeles, California
 Santa Monica, California
 South Pasadena, California

Soundtrack
There was an original soundtrack released on January 16, 1991, but now it is very rare.

 "Book of Love" - Ben E King & Bo Diddley ft. Doug Lazy
 "The Great Pretender" - The Platters
 "Fools Fall in Love" - The Drifters
 "The Fool" - Sanford Clark
 "Little Darlin'" - The Diamonds
 "Sincerely" - The Moonglows
 "Come Back My Love" - The Cardinals
 "Hearts of Stone" - The Fontane Sisters
 "What Can I Do" - Donnie Elbert
 "Rip It Up" - Little Richard
 "When Johnny Comes Marching Home"
 "The Good, the Bad, and the Ugly Theme"
 "Why Do Fools Fall in Love" - Frankie Lymon and the Teenagers
 "School Days" - Chuck Berry
 "Let the Good Times Roll" - Shirley & Lee

According to the end credits of the movie, these songs were also used:
 1 Bourbon, 1 Scotch, 1 Beer (John Lee Hooker)
 Earth Angel (The Penguins)
 Be-Bop-a-Lula (Gene Vincent)
 Rocket 88 (Jackie Brenston and his Delta Cats)
 Hold me, thrill me, kiss me (performed by prom band)
 See ya later Alligator (performed by prom band)
 Graduation Day (The Four Freshmen)
 How can I tell her? (The Four Freshmen)

Reception
For his performance in this film, John Cameron Mitchell was nominated for one Chicago Film Critics Association Awards in the category of "Most Promising Actor".

Rita Kempley from The Washington Post wrote: "'Book of Love' is a mild-mannered foray into the '50s, a modest coming of age comedy that is as thickly nostalgic as a yearbook. Though not strictly a trip back in time, it is a kind of "Peggy Sue Got Married" for the fellows, a chance to hum some old music and recall one's raging hormones." Peter Travers from Rolling Stone magazine panned the film, stating: "What the world needs now is a lot of things, but I suspect that one of them is not another movie about growing up in the Fifties...William Kotzwinkle, author of the acclaimed novelization of "E.T.," adapted this script from his book "Jack in the Box." But the film's virtues are, at best, modest. For Kotzwinkle and Robert Shaye — the New Line studio chief who is making a sincere but inauspicious debut as a director — the Fifties strike a personal chord".

On Rotten Tomatoes the film has 3 reviews, 2 positive, 1 negative.

References

External links
 

1990 films
1990 romantic comedy films
American romantic comedy films
1990s English-language films
Films scored by Stanley Clarke
Films based on American novels
Films set in the 1950s
Films shot in California
Films shot in Los Angeles
New Line Cinema films
Films directed by Robert Shaye
Teen sex comedy films
1991 comedy films
1991 films
1990s American films